Emmy Carolina Rappe (14 February 1835 – 19 October 1896) was a Swedish nurse and principal for a nursing school. She was the pioneer and founder of the Swedish nursing education. She was the first trained professional nurse and the first principal of the first nursing education in her country.

Life
Rappe was born to landowner Baron Adolf Fredrik Rappe and Ulrika Catharina Wilhelmina Hammarskjöld. She was given a strict education where a sense of duty and a sensible economy was regarded as important, and being an unmarried noblewoman, she stayed under the supervision of her family until the age of thirty. She had an early interest in medicine and nursing. She was reportedly inspired by her aunt Elisabeth "Elise" Rappe.

In 1866, the newly established Swedish Red Cross wished to establish a nursing school in Sweden, and was in search for an educated principal to head the institution. Sophie Adlersparre made a deal with Florence Nightingale, that the person selected for the task should be educated by Nightingale in London, and then advertised for a suitable candidate in her publication Tidskrift för hemmet. 
Rappe was considered to be a suitable candidate to establish a proper school for the education of professional nurses in Sweden. She was sent as a student to Florence Nightingales school Florence Nightingale School of Nursing and Midwifery at St Thomas' Hospital in London (now part of King's College London) in 1866. She was personally tutored by Florence Nightingale, who was pleased with her as a student. Rappe shared the view that nursing was a calling.

Emmy Rappe returned to Sweden in 1867, and studied at Sahlgrenska sjukhuset hospital in Göteborg and at others clinics in Stockholm. In 1867-1877, she was head nurse at the newly established Surgical Clinic at the Uppsala Academic Hospital, and principal of the nursing school there, which had been newly established by the Red Cross. This was the first secular training courses for nurses in Sweden: the only formal education previously available for nurses was the deaconess institution opened by Maria Cederschiöld in 1851.

Rappe was a pioneer, and was often met with resistance from the authorities. As a Baroness, she aroused controversy by engaging in such a profession, and she did, in fact, not accept any salary. She encouraged a sense of professional loyalty among nurses toward other nurses, and tried to raise the status of the profession by insisting on medical competence and high moral. In 1877–1886, she was supervisor for the Uppsala Central Hospital for the insane. After her retirement, she was active as a hospital inspector and within the Red Cross. Emmy Rappe was related to Thorborg Rappe, who was a contemporary authority in the education of Intellectual disability.

Emmy Rappe was awarded H. M. The King's Medal in 1877 and Illis Quorum in 1895.

Legacy
A road on Ulleråker in Uppsala is named after her: Emmy Rappes väg (Emmy Rappe Street).

See also 
 Karolina Widerström, the first female physician graduated in Sweden.

Literature
 1977 – "God bless you, my dear miss Nightingale" : letters from Emmy Carolina Rappe to Florence Nightingale 1867–1870

References
 Sven G. Sjöberg:Från Strömsrum till London. Om Emmy Carolina Rappe och hennes brevväxling med Florence Nightingale 
 Österberg, Carin et al., Svenska kvinnor: föregångare, nyskapare. Lund: Signum 1990.
 Idun, magazine, number 44, 1896
 Emmy C Rappe, urn:sbl:7552, Svenskt biografiskt lexikon (art av Stina Nicklasson), hämtad 2015-03-10.

Further reading 
 

1835 births
1896 deaths
Swedish nurses
19th-century Swedish people
Swedish nobility
Recipients of the Illis quorum